Zeidora calceolina is a species of sea snail, a marine gastropod mollusk in the family Fissurellidae, the keyhole limpets and slit limpets. It is found in Western Pacific in Japan and Philippines and found in depths of 50 to 200 meters.

References

External links
 To Biodiversity Heritage Library (12 publications)
 To USNM Invertebrate Zoology Mollusca Collection
 To ITIS
 To World Register of Marine Species

Fissurellidae
Gastropods described in 1860